Gohpur Assembly constituency is one of the 126 assembly constituencies of Assam Legislative Assembly. Gohpur forms part of the Tezpur Lok Sabha constituency.

Members of Legislative Assembly
 1951: Gahan Chandra Goswami, Indian National Congress
 1957: Bishnulal Upadhyaya, Indian National Congress
 1962: Bishnulal Upadhyaya, Indian National Congress
 1967: Bishnulal Upadhyaya, Indian National Congress
 1973: Ram Chandra Sarmah, Samyukta Socialist Party
 1978: Ram Chandra Sarmah, Janata Party
 1985: Ganesh Kutum, Independent
 1991: Kosheswar Barua, Indian National Congress
 1996: Ganesh Kutum, Asom Gana Parishad
 2001: Ripun Bora, Indian National Congress
 2006: Ripun Bora, Indian National Congress
 2011: Monika Bora, Indian National Congress
 2016: Utpal Borah, Bharatiya Janata Party
 2021: Utpal Borah, Bharatiya Janata Party

Election results

2016 result

See also
 Biswanath district
 List of constituencies of Assam Legislative Assembly

References

External links 
 

Assembly constituencies of Assam
Sonitpur district
Biswanath district